Thymophylla is a genus of perennial flowering plants in the tribe Tageteae within the family Asteraceae. Pricklyleaf is a common name for plants in this genus.

The generic name is derived from the Greek words θύμον (thymon), meaning "thyme", and φύλλον (phyllon), meaning "leaf".

 Species
 Thymophylla acerosa (DC.) Strother – pricklyleaf dogweed, Texas dogweed - TX NM AZ UT NV
 Thymophylla aurantiaca (Brandegee) Rydb. - Puebla, Oaxaca
 Thymophylla aurea (A.Gray) Greene ex Britton – manyawn pricklyleaf - TX NM CO KS Chihuahua, Coahuila, Durango
 Thymophylla concinna (A.Gray) Strother – Sonoran pricklyleaf - AZ (Pima County) Sonora
 Thymophylla gentryi (M.C.Johnst.) Strother - Durango
 Thymophylla gypsophila (B.L.Turner) Strother - Coahuila
 Thymophylla micropoides (DC.) Strother – woolly pricklyleaf - TX Chihuahua, Coahuila, Durango, Hidalgo, Nuevo León, San Luis Potosí, Tamaulipas
 Thymophylla mutica (M.C.Johnst.) Strother - Tamaulipas
 Thymophylla pentachaeta (DC.) Small – five-needle pricklyleaf - TX Chihuahua, Sonora, Jalisco, Nuevo León, Aguascalientes, Baja California, Tamaulipas, Zacatecas
 Thymophylla setifolia Lag. – Texas pricklyleaf - TX NM Aguascalientes, Chihuahua, Coahuila, Durango, Guanajuato, Hidalgo, Nuevo León, Querétaro, San Luis Potosí, Tamaulipas, Zacatecas, Veracruz
 Thymophylla tenuifolia (Cass.) Rydb. - México State, Tlaxcala, Puebla, Coahuila, Durango, Hidalgo, Nuevo León, Zacatecas
 Thymophylla tenuiloba (DC.) Small – bristleleaf pricklyleaf - TX NM Coahuila, Nuevo León, Nayarit, Tamaulipas
 Thymophylla tephroleuca (S.F.Blake) Strother – ashy pricklyleaf, ashy dogweed - TX

 formerly included
see Adenophyllum 
 Thymophylla anomala - Adenophyllum anomalum 
 Thymophylla neomexicana - Adenophyllum wriightii

References

External links
 
 
 Jepson Manual Treatment
 USDA Plants Profile

Tageteae
Asteraceae genera
Flora of North America
Taxa named by Mariano Lagasca